Jukebox is a 2013 studio album by Swedish band, Drifters.

Track listing
Vacation (Hank Hunton, Gary Waston, Connie Francis)
Säger du nej? (Henrik Sethson, Ulf Georgsson)
Jukebox (Uffe Börjesson, Calle Kindbom, Dick Karlsson)
1:a gången (Magnus Uggla, Anders Henriksson)
Please Mr. Postman (Brian Holland, Robert Bateman, Freddie Gorman)
En tuff brud i lyxförpackning (Simon Brehm, Sven Paddock, Gösta Stevens)
Det måste gå (Henrik Sethson, Mikael Wigström)
Livet kommer inte i repris (Mats Tärnfors, Marica Lindé)
Det blir alltid som du vill (Mats Tärnfors, Marica Lindé)
Det är vi (Henrik Sethson, Calle Kindbom)
I goda vänners lag (Peter Samuelsson, Thomas Berglund, Håkan Swärd)
Ingen i världen som du (Henrik Sethsson, Thomas Berglund, Ulf Georgsson)

Charts

References 

2013 albums
Drifters (Swedish band) albums
Swedish-language albums